The 2002 season was the 10th season of competitive association football in Armenia.

Premier League
 FC Malatia disbanded before the start of the season. FC Lori from Vanadzor were given another chance to stay up.
 Karabakh Yerevan changed their name to Lernayin Artsakh FC.

First League
 Araks, Lokomotiv Yerevan, Dinamo Yeghvard, and Nork Marash FC are introduced to the league.
 Arpa FC, and FC Vanadzor returned to professional football. 
 Karmrakhayt Armavir changed their name back to FC Armavir.

External links
 RSSSF: Armenia 2002